Jamey Mosley (born March 28, 1996) is an American football linebacker who is currently a free agent. He played college football at Alabama. Mosley was signed by the Jets as an undrafted free agent in 2019.

Professional career

New York Jets
Mosley was signed by the New York Jets as an undrafted free agent on May 10, 2019. He was waived during final roster cuts on August 31, 2019, but was re-signed to the team's practice squad the next day. He was released on October 7, 2019. On November 1, Mosley was re-signed to the practice squad. He was released on November 25.

Arizona Cardinals
On December 18, 2019, Mosley was signed to the Arizona Cardinals practice squad.  His practice squad contract with the team expired on January 6, 2020.

Personal life
His brother is New York Jets inside linebacker C.J. Mosley.

References

External links 
Alabama Crimson Tide bio
New York Jets bio

1996 births
Living people
Alabama Crimson Tide football players
American football linebackers
Arizona Cardinals players
New York Jets players
Players of American football from Alabama
Sportspeople from Mobile, Alabama